Richard Lumb (born 18 November 1955) is an Australian sailor. He competed in the 470 event at the 1984 Summer Olympics.

References

External links
 

1955 births
Living people
Australian male sailors (sport)
Olympic sailors of Australia
Sailors at the 1984 Summer Olympics – 470
Place of birth missing (living people)